is a railway station on the Iida Line in the village of Miyada, Kamiina District,  Nagano Prefecture, Japan, operated by Central Japan Railway Company (JR Central).

Lines
Miyada Station is served by the Iida Line and is 169.1 kilometers from the starting point of the line at Toyohashi Station.

Station layout
The station consists of two ground-level opposed side platforms connected by a footbridge. The station is unattended.

Platforms

Adjacent stations

History
The station opened on 27 December 1913 as Miyata Station. It was renamed Miyada on 15 December 1956. With the privatization of Japanese National Railways (JNR) on 1 April 1987, the station came under the control of JR Central.

Passenger statistics
In fiscal 2016, the station was used by an average of 350 passengers daily (boarding passengers only).

Surrounding area
Miyada Village Hall
Miyada Elementary School
Miyada Junior High School

See also
 List of railway stations in Japan

References

External links

 Miyada Station information 

Railway stations in Nagano Prefecture
Railway stations in Japan opened in 1913
Stations of Central Japan Railway Company
Iida Line
Miyada, Nagano